Luis Balcells (1903 – 31 May 1927) was a Spanish breaststroke swimmer. He competed in two events at the 1920 Summer Olympics.

References

External links
 

1903 births
1927 deaths
Spanish male breaststroke swimmers
Olympic swimmers of Spain
Swimmers at the 1920 Summer Olympics
Swimmers from Barcelona